The 1985 Oklahoma Sooners football team represented the University of Oklahoma in the 1985 NCAA Division I-A football season. This year was Barry Switzer's 13th season as head coach. The Sooners ended this season with 11 wins and a sole loss coming to the Miami Hurricanes in Norman, in a game in which the Sooners lost starting quarterback Troy Aikman for the season. The Sooners were forced to place their trust in lightning-quick true freshman quarterback Jamelle Holieway and a physical defense featuring three All-Americans, who led them to a Big 8 Conference title and a national championship. This was Oklahoma's sixth national championship and 34th conference championship in school history.

Schedule

Roster

Rankings

Game summaries
After struggling in the 1985 Orange Bowl to a scrappy Washington Huskies football team and letting any National Championship aspirations for that year disappear in a puff of smoke (and be awarded to the BYU Cougars, the nation's only undefeated college football team that year), the defending Big 8 Champion Sooners came into the 1985 season on a mission.  Led by an aggressive and punishing defense (which later drew comparisons to their NFL counterpart Chicago Bears) and budding superstar quarterback sophomore Troy Aikman, the Sooners seemed poised for a run at the Orange Bowl and the National Championship.

Nothing seemed to indicate otherwise, as the Sooners rolled past Minnesota and Kansas State before beating the Longhorns in the annual Red River Shootout.

at Minnesota

at Kansas State

vs. Texas (Red River Shootout)

Source: 
    
    
    

The Sooners' offense didn't have a banner day in the 80th edition of the Red River Rivalry although they still rolled up 220 yards rushing and Troy Aikman completed four of nine passes for 67 yards. Lydell Carr led all rushers with 80 yards on 23 carries, and Patrick Collins added 61 yards on four carries. Keith Jackson had 49 yards on his two receptions.

On the game's third play, Oklahoma's All-American nose guard Tony Casillas went down with a sprained right knee. The Oklahoma defense, even without Casillas, manhandled Texas. The Sooners held the Longhorns to just 70 yards in total offense, 17 on the ground for an average of less than half a yard per their 35 carries, and just four first downs. They got into Oklahoma territory only three times, twice to the 49-yard line and once to the 46, and one of those trips was thanks to another fumble. In addition, the Sooners picked off three passes, and Texas was held to no first downs in the second half.  Brian Bosworth finished the game with 14 tackles, 11 of them unassisted, and a leaping interception of quarterback Todd Dodge.

Miami (FL)

    
    
    
    
    
    
    

The third-ranked Sooners (3-0) returned home to play their first game in Norman, hosting unranked Miami (4-1). The game made local headlines as a homecoming for Hurricanes coach Jimmy Johnson who was an Oklahoma defensive line coach with Switzer from '70-'72 and went 0-5 against the Sooners as the Oklahoma State head coach.

Oklahoma came into the contest with the nation's most aggressive defense (leading to their comparisons to the Monsters of the Midway), which seemingly got better each week, and was led up front by All-American nose tackle Tony Casillas, whose injury against Texas forced him to miss the game. The line featured sophomore tackle Troy Johnson, sophomore end Darrell Reed, and senior end Kevin Murphy, himself an All-American candidate. Lining up behind the group was the menacing Brian Bosworth, with fellow linebackers Paul Migliazzo and Dante Jones (another talented sophomore). This group had permitted an average of only 32 yards rushing per game. Juniors Tony Rayburn and Sonny Brown, and sophomores Rickey Dixon and Derrick White, patrolled the secondary, allowing only 91 yards passing per game. In three games, the defense had allowed only 16 first downs and had permitted an average of 6.6 points per game.

Miami had lost their '85 opener to Florida, 35-23, before reeling off four straight wins against unranked opponents. The Hurricanes were the nation's top offensive team, and they were sporting a pro-style passing attack, orchestrated by junior quarterback Vinny Testaverde, who had backed up Bernie Kosar the last time the Hurricanes had won the National Championship. Alonzo Highsmith and Melvin Bratton lined up in the backfield, and the acrobatics of top-flight wide receivers Michael Irvin and Brian Blades helped the team average 36.2 points per game. The Hurricane defense came in after a shutout of Cincinnati, permitting an average of only 16 points per game, featuring junior tackle Jerome Brown and cornerback Bennie Blades.

In front of a sellout crowd of 75,008 at Memorial Stadium, Miami's Jerome Brown broke through and sacked Aikman on the 29-yard line with 9:18 left in the first half and broke his ankle. Aikman, who had been six of eight passing for 131 yards, would be lost for the season.

Testaverde and company took over, scorching the Oklahoma secondary with 270 yards passing and the 'Canes rambled for 105 on the ground. They played mistake-free football and didn't give up any turnovers.  Brown led the Miami defensive effort with 16 tackles, a blocked field goal, and the sack on Aikman. And on the other side, pressed into duty as a true freshman, Holieway had rushed for only 57 yards on 17 carries and attempted just six passes.

Furious about the loss, both of the game and their starting quarterback, Oklahoma proceeded to go on a rampage, pasting Iowa State, Kansas, Missouri and Colorado by a combined score of 189-26, before playing host to Nebraska in a game that would ultimately decide the Big 8 Championship.

Iowa State

Kansas

at Missouri

Colorado

Nebraska

    
    
    
    
    
    

Nebraska came into Norman ranked second in the nation, with the nation's highest scoring offense and the best rushing attack in the country with 395 yards per game.  This high-powered offense was led by fullback Tom Rathman, one of the best in Nebraska history who had rushed for over 800 yards that season.  Together with quarterback McCathorn Clayton and junior I-back Doug DuBose, whose 1,115 rushing yards made 1985 his second straight season over 1,000, the Cornhuskers were poised for a national title run. Junior linebacker Marc Munford was the leading tackler for the Huskers for the second straight year and led the defense, together with tackle Jim Skow and defensive back Brian Washington.

The home team struck quickly. On their second possession of the game, Oklahoma was faced with a second down-and-six at its 12, and they ran a tight end reverse.  Freshman quarterback Jamelle Holieway, starting just his fifth game and in charge of a wishbone that was the third best rushing offense in the land, optioned to the left and gave a reverse handoff to big sophomore tight end Keith Jackson, who raced untouched down the right sideline 88 yards for a touchdown, the sixth longest run in school history.

Tom Osborne was forced to reach into his bag of tricks in the second quarter, as Nebraska executed a perfect double reverse.   Clayton flipped the ball to DuBose who headed right, and DuBose handed the ball to wingback Van Sheppard who carried it 52 yards before being brought down inside the Sooner ten. The Oklahoma defense, led by senior nose tackle Tony Casillas and sophomore linebacker Brian Bosworth, did not budge.  The Cornhuskers, stifled at the point of attack, were forced to kick a field goal.  Sophomore kicker Dale Klein missed a 23-yard field goal attempt and the Huskers were kept off the board after their best offensive series of the game.

In fact, the only time the Huskers would score that day was on defense, and then only as a side note.  Freshman backup quarterback Eric Mitchel bobbled a handoff, and Nebraska defensive tackle Chris Spachman caught the Sooner fumble in midair and rambled 76 yards down the left sideline for a touchdown with only 26 seconds left. The Sooners had won 27-7.

The Oklahoma defense was devastating, holding the nation's highest scoring offense without a point.  Bosworth had nine tackles, Murphy sacked the quarterback twice, including the stopper on one of the goal line stands, and Casillas was all over the Nebraska backfield. They held the Huskers to just 161 yards on 42 carries, led by Sheppard's 65 yards and with DuBose gaining only 46 on 16 carries. It was the second straight year that the Sooners had held the Huskers to just a touchdown and the first time they had accomplished that feat in back-to-back games in 27 years.

Holieway was spectacular, directing the wishbone as if he were far more experienced than his true freshman status. He was virtually flawless as he rushed for 110 yards on 25 carries and scored a pair of touchdowns. Keith Jackson ran for 136 yards on just three carries and scored once. Together they accounted for 246 yards on the ground, representing more than half the team's 461 total yards.  This marked the first time in 11 years that two Sooners had crossed the century mark rushing against the Huskers.

at Oklahoma St

"The Ice Bowl"

Tim Lashar sets Oklahoma single season school field goal record.

SMU

vs. Penn State (Orange Bowl)

    
    
    
    
    
    
    
    

Earlier in the day, UCLA had crushed #4 Iowa 45-28 in the Rose Bowl.  SEC champion Tennessee and Miami were playing in the Sugar Bowl, with the Hurricanes allowed an outside shot at the title with a Penn State loss.  The Sooners needed either a win combined with a Miami loss or a blowout victory to claim the title during the 1986 Orange Bowl.

On their opening possession, Oklahoma reached into their bag of tricks and a handoff to Keith Jackson was flipped to Anthony Stafford, but linebacker Shane Conlan was ready for it, stuffing the play for a two-yard loss. This set the initial tempo of the game, as the Penn State defense showed itself to be ready for the speedy Sooner wishbone option.

The game was very close, and remained a defensive struggle into the 4th quarter, but Oklahoma proved to be too much for the Lions, particularly after it was announced at the half that Tennessee was pounding Miami to the tune of 28-7 in the Sugar Bowl.  The Sooner defense played inspired football, Tim Lashar nailed four critical field goals, Keith Jackson caught a 71-yard bomb from Jamelle Holieway in stride, and Lydell Carr put the nail in the coffin with a brilliant 61-yard touchdown scamper with 1:42 remaining on the clock.

The Sooners scored a 25-10 victory over the top team in the land in the 1986 Orange Bowl and the team's sixth National Championship.

Awards and honors

All-Americans
 Brian Bosworth, Linebacker – Irving, Texas 
 Tony Casillas, Noseguard – Tulsa, Okla. 
 Kevin Murphy, Defensive end – Richardson, Texas

Individual award winners
 Brian Bosworth – Dick Butkus Award
 Tony Casillas – Lombardi Award

Postseason

NFL draft

The following players were drafted into the National Football League following the season.

References

External links
 Soonerstats.com breakdown of the 1985 schedule
 Roster for the 1985 Sooners
 Jamelle Holieway's 71 yard touchdown pass to Keith Jackson 1986 Orange Bowl

Oklahoma
Oklahoma Sooners football seasons
College football national champions
Big Eight Conference football champion seasons
Orange Bowl champion seasons
Oklahoma Sooners football